In comics, Thunderer may refer to:

 Thunderer (DC Comics), a DC Comics character
 Three Marvel Comics characters:
 Thunderer (Marvel Comics), a Marvel Comics character
 Lei Kung (comics), an Iron Fist character also known as Lei Kung the Thunderer
 Sparrow, another Iron Fist character also called Thunderer

References

See also
Thunderer (disambiguation)